Simon Cox (born 25 January 1977) is a former Australian rules footballer who played with the Western Bulldogs and Hawthorn in the Australian Football League (AFL).

A left footed wingman, from Keith, Cox played his first senior SANFL game at 16 for Glenelg and was recruited to the Western Bulldogs from where he made his league debut in 1995. Cox was delisted in 2001 after 58 games and was picked up by Hawthorn in the draft. He finished second in the 2002 Hawthorn Best and Fairest award. but was de-listed at the end of the 2003 season at the age of 26. Cox later played in the KNTFL for Keith and Naracoorte.

References

External links

1977 births
Living people
Australian rules footballers from South Australia
Western Bulldogs players
Hawthorn Football Club players
Glenelg Football Club players
Eltham Football Club players
People from Keith, South Australia